The Prix Henry Vieuxtemps is a violin competition held in Verviers, Belgium.  It is named after the famed violinist and composer Henri Vieuxtemps.

Applicants must be at or below 26 years of age, have attended a Belgian Conservatory for one year, and received a degree in violin performance.

Program

First Round: 

 The first movement of a concerto by W. A. Mozart (with cadenza) 

 A sonata or partita for solo violin by J. S. Bach or a sonata by E. Ysaye

 One of the studies (Op. 48) or a short piece by Henry Vieuxtemps 

Final Round: 

 A virtuoso piece by Henry Vieuxtemps (this work can be a movement of a concerto) 

 A complete violin sonata

 A complete violin concerto 

 A piece of your choice

Previous winners
1920 : Alfred Dubois
1923 : Hector Clokers
1925 : Lambert Hody
1927 : Edmond Ferari
1929 : François Wigny
1931 : Arthur Michot
1933 : Carlo van Neste
1935 : Marie Walthéry
1937 : Albert Speguel
1939 : Arthur Grumiaux
1941 : Georges Octors
1943 : Marcel Debot
1945 : not awarded
1947 : not awarded
1949 : G. Lardinois-Altmann
1951 : Pierre Jetteur
1953 : Clémens-René Quatacker
1955 : Henri-Emmanuel Koch
1957 : not awarded
1959 : Sándor Károlyi
1961 : Léopold Douin
1963 : Charles Jongen
1966 : Jean Hervé 
1970 : Mayumi Fujikawa
1974 : János Máté
1978 : John Snow
1982 : Ginette De Cuyper
1986 : Eric Melon
1990 : Péi Péi Zhu
1994 : Jean-Gabriel Raelet
1998 : Tatiana Samouïl
2002 : Lei Wang
2006 : Hrachya Avanesyan
2011 : Claire Dassesse
2015 : Floris Willem
2017 : not awarded
2020 : Vilmos Csikos

External links
http://www.prixvieuxtemps.be/index.htm
http://associationhenryvieuxtemps.com/concours-vieuxtemps-a-verviers/

Violin competitions
Verviers
Music competitions in Belgium